Mohsin Kamal (born June 16, 1963 in Lahore) is a former Pakistani cricketer who played in 9 Tests and 19 ODIs from 1984 to 1994.

Kamal was appointed coach of the Bangladesh national cricket team in 2002. He was sacked in March 2003 shortly before the end of his one-year contract, following the team's poor performance at the 2003 Cricket World Cup in South Africa.

References

1963 births
Living people
Pakistan Test cricketers
Pakistan One Day International cricketers
Lahore City cricketers
Lahore City Whites cricketers
Allied Bank Limited cricketers
Pakistan National Shipping Corporation cricketers
Lahore City Blues cricketers
Pakistan Starlets cricketers
Pakistani cricket coaches
Cricketers from Faisalabad
Coaches of the Bangladesh national cricket team
Pakistani expatriates in Bangladesh